James Robert Martin Jr. (November 30, 1909 – November 14, 1984) was a United States district judge of the United States District Court for the Eastern District of South Carolina, the United States District Court for the Western District of South Carolina and later the United States District Court for the District of South Carolina.

Education and career

Born in Greenville, South Carolina, Martin received a Bachelor of Laws from Washington and Lee University School of Law in 1931. He was in private practice in Greenville from 1931 to 1944. He was a member of the South Carolina House of Representatives from Greenville County from 1943 to 1944. He was a judge of the Thirteenth Judicial Circuit of South Carolina from 1944 to 1961.

Federal judicial service

Martin was nominated by President John F. Kennedy on August 30, 1961, to the United States District Court for the Eastern District of South Carolina and to the United States District Court for the Western District of South Carolina, to a new joint seat created by 75 Stat. 80. He was confirmed by the United States Senate on September 8, 1961, and received his commission on September 18, 1961. He served as Chief Judge of the Western District from 1962 to 1965. He was reassigned by operation of law to the United States District Court for the District of South Carolina on November 1, 1965, to a new seat authorized by 79 Stat. 951. He served as Chief Judge from 1965 to 1979. He assumed senior status on November 30, 1979. Martin served in that capacity until his death on November 14, 1984.

References

Sources
 

1909 births
1984 deaths
Members of the South Carolina House of Representatives
Judges of the United States District Court for the Western District of South Carolina
Judges of the United States District Court for the Eastern District of South Carolina
Judges of the United States District Court for the District of South Carolina
United States district court judges appointed by John F. Kennedy
20th-century American judges
20th-century American lawyers
Washington and Lee University School of Law alumni
20th-century American politicians